San Marcos is a town and municipality located in the Sucre Department, northern Colombia. It is also called "La Perla del San Jorge".

The town is served by San Marcos Airport.

References
 Gobernacion de Sucre - San Marcos

References

Sucre